The following writing scripts have not been allocated an ISO 15924 code.

 Gugyeol
 Gupta script
 iConji
 Laṇḍā scripts
 Quikscript
 Romanian transitional alphabet
 Szarvas inscription
 Teeline Shorthand
 Tironian notes
 Great Lakes Algonquian syllabics

See also 
:Category:Scripts with ISO 15924 four-letter codes
ISO 15924
List of ISO 15924 codes by letter code

Writing systems
ISO 15924
Scripts